State for the People is a political party founded by Georgian operatic bass Paata Burchuladze in 2016. After Paata Burchuladze left Georgia, Nika Machutadze became chairman.

State for the People Coalition
The State for the People Coalition was created on 18 August 2016. It took part in 2016 parliamentary elections, coming sixth with 3.45 percent of the vote.

Constituent parties
Paata Burchuladze — State For the People
New Rights
Giorgi Vashadze – New Georgia

Former Members
New Political Center — Girchi

Electoral performance

Parliamentary election

Local election

External links
Official Facebook page

2016 establishments in Georgia (country)
Christian democratic parties in Asia
Christian democratic parties in Europe
Conservative parties in Georgia (country)
Centre-right parties in Georgia (country)
Political parties established in 2016
Political party alliances in Georgia (country)
Pro-European political parties in Georgia (country)